Serbian printing refers to the history of printing among Serbs, and focusing on development of book printing in Serbian, with the use of the Serbian Cyrillic alphabet, from the end of the 15th century up to the end of the 18th century. The first state printing house, the Serbian Printing House, was established in 1832.

Printing houses
Early modern period
 Crnojević printing house (1494—1496)
 Vuković printing house (1519/1520—1521) and (1536—1540)
 Goražde printing house (1519—1523)
 Rujno Monastery printing house (1537)
 Luka Primojević
 Gračanica printing house (1539)
 Mileševa printing house (1544—1557)
 Belgrade printing house (1552)
 South Slavic Bible Institute where Jovan Maleševac and Matija Popović worked as translators (1561-1565) 
 Mrkšina crkva printing house (1562—1566)
 Skadar printing house (1563)
 Zagurović printing house (1569—1570)
 Rampazetto and Heirs (1597—1616)
 Trojan Gundulić
 Hieromonk Pahomije
 Hieromonk Makarije
 Josef von Kurzböck printing house, in Vienna, Cyrillic works, from 1771 until 1792 until the sale to Stefan von Novaković
 Stefan von Novaković's printing house, in Vienna, printed and published books until 1796 until the sale to the University of Pest
 Srbulje
 Radoslav's Gospel

See also
 Serbian literature

References

Sources

External links
 

Serbian literature
History of printing
Cultural history of Serbia
Serbian culture